Koffi Nicolas Dognon (born 16 June 1989) is a Niger-born, Beninese retired football striker.

References

1989 births
Living people
Beninese footballers
Benin international footballers
Nigerien footballers
Nigerien people of Beninese descent
Sahel SC players
AS Douanes (Niger) players
AS SONIDEP players
Association football forwards